Laurito is the surname of the following people:
André Laurito (born 1983), German football player
Federico Laurito (born 1990), Argentine football player
Marisa Laurito (born 1951), Italian actress, singer and television personality 
Romina Laurito (born 1987), Italian rhythmic gymnast